Greatest Hits Remixes is a 2001 album by 2 Unlimited, a Eurodance project founded in 1991 by Belgian producers Jean-Paul DeCoster and Phil Wilde and fronted by Dutch rapper Ray Slijngaard and Dutch vocalist Anita Doth.

Album information
Greatest Hits Remixes was the first 2 Unlimited album to include a remix of a non-single, Delight, from 1992's studio album Get Ready!.

Release history
Containing 16 remixed tracks, the album was released in 2001 in Japan.

Track listing

 No Limit (RM Radio Edit) (3:13)
 Twilight Zone (R-Control Mix) (5:42)
 Get Ready For This (K-Groove Mix Edit) (3:38)
 Maximum Overdrive (KC Radio Mix) (4:10)
 Let The Beat Control Your Body (I.O.Sonic Remix) (4:57)
 Workaholic (B4's Reconstruct Mix) (5:05)
 Tribal Dance (Almighty Mix Radio) (3:48)
 The Real Thing (B4 Za Beat Single Remix) (4:06)
 The Magic Friend (MST Radio Mix) (3:42)
 Delight (PKG Remix Edit) (4:11)
 No Limit (Starfighter Remix Edit) (3:17)
 Twilight Zone (DJ Jean Edit) (3:13)
 Get Ready For This (Sunclub Radio Mix) (3:34)
 The Magic Friend (3 Drives On A Vinyl Radio Edit) (3:09)
 No Limit (Razor & Guido Remix) (4:10)
 Twilight Zone (Sharp "Maniac" Mix) (7:11)

References

2 Unlimited albums
2001 remix albums